This is a list of video games published or developed by Activision.

Sections 
 List of Activision games: 1980–1999
 List of Activision games: 2000–2009
 List of Activision games: 2010–2019
 List of Activision games: 2020–present
 List of Activision Value games

Activision